Pointe Aux Barques Township is a civil township of Huron County in the U.S. state of Michigan. The population was 15 at the 2020 census. 

Pointe Aux Barques is located at the tip of the Thumb on the Lower Peninsula.  With a permanent population of only 15, the township is the least-populated municipality in the state and the third smallest township by land area after Novi Township and Royal Oak Charter Township.

Communities
The name is a French translation of "point of ships" and was named by French sailors as early as 1760. The community had its own post office from June 12, 1897 until June 20, 1957.

Geography

The township is located at the northern end of The Thumb.  Turnip Rock, an undercut stack, is located just off the shores of the mainland. Surrounded by private property, it is only accessible by water, and there is no public road access.  Pointe aux Barques Light bears the name of the township but is located in neighboring Huron Township.

Demographics

As of the census of 2020, there were 15 people, 11 households, and 7 families residing in the township. There were 70 housing units, but many of the building were units of secondary housing not used by full-time residents.

References 

Townships in Huron County, Michigan
Townships in Michigan
Populated places established in 1903
1903 establishments in Michigan
Populated places on Lake Huron in the United States